Rutja is a village in Haljala Parish, Lääne-Viru County, northern Estonia. It is located on the coast of the Bay of Finland and on the western shore of the Selja River. It neighbours Karepa in the east.

Rutja has beautiful beaches and (mainly pine) forests. It was first mentioned in 1489.

A disused Soviet military airfield Rutja Airfield is located in Rutja. It was home to 66th Soviet Attack Air Regiment which flew up to 45 Su-17 aircraft.

References

Villages in Lääne-Viru County